Dundas is a surname and a Scottish clan (Clan Dundas). Notable people with the surname include:

 Charles Dundas (disambiguation), multiple people
 David Dundas (disambiguation), multiple people
 Francis Dundas (c. 1759–1824), British army officer
 George Dundas (disambiguation), multiple people
 Henry Dundas (disambiguation), multiple people
 Hugh Dundas (1920–1995), British World War II fighter pilot
 James Dundas (disambiguation), multiple people
 John Dundas (disambiguation), multiple people
 Lawrence Dundas (disambiguation), multiple people
 Maria Callcott (née Dundas; 1785–1842), British writer
 Mark Dundas, 4th Marquess of Zetland (born 1937), British peer
 Paul Dundas (born 1952), Scottish scholar
 Richard Saunders Dundas (1802–1861), British naval officer
 Robert Dundas (disambiguation), multiple people
 Roslyn Dundas (born 1978), Australian politician
 Thomas Dundas (disambiguation), multiple people
 William Dundas (1762–1845), Scottish politician
 William Dundas of Fingask (died 1599), Scottish courtier
 William John Dundas (1849–1921), Scottish lawyer and mathematician

See also
Dundas (disambiguation)
Charlotte Dundas, steamboat